|}

The Paddy Kehoe Suspended Ceilings Novice Hurdle is a Grade 2 National Hunt novice hurdle race in Ireland. It is run at Fairyhouse, over a distance of 2 miles (3,218 metres) and it is scheduled to take place each year in March or April at the course's Easter Festival. The 2017 running was moved to a fixture in early April to avoid clashing with similar races at the Punchestown Festival. It is currently sponsored by Paddy Kehoe Suspended Ceilings.
During the 1990s it was known as the Jameson Gold Cup (Novice) Hurdle and during the 1970s & 1980s was known as the Fingal Hurdle.

Records
Leading jockey since 1989 (5 wins):
 Paul Carberry –  Cardinal Hill (1999), Ross Moff (2000), Scottish Memories (2002), Jered (2008), Prima Vista (2011) 

Leading trainer since 1989  (10 wins):
 Willie Mullins -  Princess Casilia (1993), Royal Alphabet (2004), Kempes (2009), Pique Sous (2013), Valseur Lido (2014), Sempre Medici (2015),	Bleu Berry (2017), 	Getabird (2018), Mister Blue Sky (2019), Echoes in Rain (2021)

Winners

See also
 Horse racing in Ireland
 List of Irish National Hunt races

References

Racing Post:
, 

National Hunt races in Ireland
National Hunt hurdle races
Fairyhouse Racecourse